Sankat Mochan Hanuman Temple is a sacred temple of the Hindu god Hanuman in the city of Lucknow, in Indian state of Uttar Pradesh.

History 
The temple was developed by a Hindu saint Neem Karoli Baba who started by building a small temple on the banks of Gomti River in Lucknow. However, in 1960, a huge flood swept most of Lucknow along with the old bridge near the temple and the old temple. Only the statue was left untouched from the floods. The Government of Uttar Pradesh allotted a plot of land near a newly constructed bridge for the temple's construction.

References

Hanuman temples
Hindu temples in Uttar Pradesh
Temples in Lucknow